Kilrush is a parish in County Clare and part of the Inis Cathaigh grouping of parishes within the Roman Catholic Diocese of Killaloe. 

Current (2022) co-parish priest is Pat Larkin.

Churches
There are two churches in the parish.

The main church is the Church of St. Senan in Toler Street in Kilrush. It was built in 1839-1840 and replaced an older slated chapel that was located in High Street. That chapel in turn replaced a thatched cabin used as chapel.

The second church of the parish is the Church of Little Senan in Monmore. This a chapel built in 1895-1896 in a rectangular shape.

gallery

References

Parishes of the Roman Catholic Diocese of Killaloe